Group B of the 2012 Africa Cup of Nations ran from 22 January until 30 January. It consisted of Angola, Burkina Faso, Ivory Coast and Sudan. The matches were held in Equatorial Guinea. Ivory Coast and Sudan progressed to the quarterfinals.

Standings

All times are West Africa Time (UTC+1).

Ivory Coast vs. Sudan

Assistant referees:
Balkrishna Bootun (Mauritius)
Angessom Ogbamariam (Eritrea)
Fourth official:
Hamada Nampiandraza (Madagascar)

Burkina Faso vs. Angola

Assistant referees:
Abdelhak Etchiali (Algeria)
Jean-Claude Birumushahu (Burundi)
Fourth official:
Gehad Grisha (Egypt)

Sudan vs. Angola

Assistant referees:
Jason Damoo (Seychelles)
David Shaanika (Namibia)
Fourth official:
Eric Otogo-Castane (Gabon)

Ivory Coast vs. Burkina Faso

Assistant referees:
Evarist Menkouande (Cameroon)
Marwa Range (Kenya)
Fourth official:
Slim Jedidi (Tunisia)

Sudan vs. Burkina Faso

Assistant referees:
Djibril Camara (Senegal)
Jean-Claude Birumushahu (Burundi)
Fourth official:
Badara Diatta (Senegal)

Ivory Coast vs. Angola

Assistant referees:
Balla Diarra (Mali)
Felicien Kabanda (Rwanda)
Fourth official:
Koman Coulibaly (Mali)

References

External links
Official website

2012 Africa Cup of Nations